Joren Dehond (born 8 August 1995) is a Belgian footballer who currently plays for Tempo Overijse in the Belgian Third Amateur Division.

External links
 

1995 births
Living people
Belgian footballers
Oud-Heverlee Leuven players
K.V. Woluwe-Zaventem players
Belgian Pro League players
Challenger Pro League players
Belgium youth international footballers

Association football defenders
Lierse Kempenzonen players